Freedom was an English psychedelic rock band, active in the late 1960s and early 1970s, formed initially by members of Procol Harum.

Ray Royer and Bobby Harrison, who had performed on the hit Procol Harum single "A Whiter Shade of Pale", were kicked out of the Harum by vocalist Gary Brooker, and replaced by Robin Trower and Barry Wilson. Royer and Harrison then formed Freedom with Steve Shirley and Tony Marsh, who was immediately replaced by pianist / organist Mike Lease, releasing two German singles and the soundtrack for the Tinto Brass/Dino de Laurentiis film Attraction (original title Nerosubianco, also known as Black on White).

In 1968, Harrison entirely overhauled the group's membership, and the new line-up began recording with more of a hard rock sound, scoring tour dates with Black Sabbath, Jethro Tull, and The James Gang. They achieved renown for their version of the Beatles song "Cry Baby Cry" on their second album Freedom at Last. Further line-up changes occurred before the band finally splintered in 1972, with Harrison going on to Snafu.

Members
Bobby Harrison - vocals and drums
Ray Royer - guitar
Steve Shirley - bass
Tony Marsh - keyboards
Mike Lease - keyboards
Robin Lumsden - keyboards
Roger Saunders - guitar
Walt Monaghan - bass
Peter Dennis - bass
Steve Jolly - guitar

Discography
Black On White (Nero Su Bianco) (1969)
Freedom at Last (BYG Actuel/ABC Records, 1970)
Freedom (reissued by Angel Air Records, originally released 1970)
Through the Years (Vertigo Records, 1971)
Is More Than A Word (Vertigo Records, 1972)

References

External links

Bobby Harrison and Freedom official website

English rock music groups
BYG Actuel artists
Musical groups established in 1967
Musical groups disestablished in 1972
Vertigo Records artists
1967 establishments in England
1972 disestablishments in England